is a Japanese singer, actress, lyricist, and tarento. She made her professional debut as the fourth member of the all-female singing group Onyanko Club in 1985. She made her solo debut with the hit song  on January 1, 1986. Nitta performed the opening and ending theme songs for the first 14 episodes of the Little Women anime television series from Nippon Animation.

Nitta attended and graduated from Fujimino Municipal Fukuoka Junior High School and Saitama Prefectural Fukuoka High School.

History
Nitta made her first appearance as the fourth member of Onyanko Club in April 1985 with an appearance on the group's Fuji TV variety show Yūyake Nyan Nyan. While she initially wanted to quit show business soon after starting, she suddenly became the most senior member of the group on April 25, 1985, following the Shūkan bunshun smoking scandal in which five members (including the first three members) of Onyanko Club were fired.

In July of that same year, she made her debut as one of Onyanko Club's lead singers with the song . From that point, she was considered the "face" of Onyanko Club due to her popularity. After graduating from high school, she continued working in the entertainment field and signed with the talent management firm .

She made her solo debut on January 1, 1986, with the hit single Winter Opera Glasses, which reached number one on the Oricon charts and sold over 300,000 copies. This was the record for a debut single for a female solo artist until Oricon changed their rules regarding what was considered a "debut" for people who had previously been a member of a group; Yuki Uchida now holds the record for a debut single for a female solo artist. Nitta was given the title "The Million Dollar Smile" on her single covers, and her smile was referred to as the "Nitta Trump", due to the extraordinary price she commanded due to her popularity. She began to regularly release singles and albums from that point.

Just before her solo debut, her father suddenly died of pneumonia on December 24, 1985, after collapsing with a high fever on the set of a movie in Hawaii. In March 1990, she retired from the entertainment world after telling people she wanted to become a lyricist. She wrote the lyrics for the songs on her last single.

In 1994, Nitta released a photo book and essay in which she returned to show business. On August 8, 1996 (just before Fuji TV moved to their present location in Odaiba), a reunion event was held for the Yūyake Nyan Nyan TV series. Nitta later married the Fuji TV employee who was in charge of the event.

Together with many of the original members of Onyanko Club, Nitta released the single,  in 2002. On December 5 that same year, the newly reunited members performed the title song as well as Don't Make Me Take Off My Sailor Suit during the 2002 FNS Kayōsai event on Fuji TV. Takashi Okamura, one half of the comedy duo Ninety-nine, is a huge fan of Nitta, and she performed in the  section of his Tobukusuri variety show. Several years later, during the "Fuji TV 24-hour Police" parody segment of the Mecha-Mecha Iketeru! variety show, Nitta's husband was "shamefully arrested" as the "Onyanko Thief" (due to his having married Nitta). In a segment for the same show in 1999, Nitta fan and tarento Thane Camus and owarai duo Asarido visited Nitta's home.

Nitta has since worked as an actress, author, and essayist, as well as participating in the Tokyo community radio program Ginza Radiocity. She has also participated, along with fellow idols such as Toshikazu Fukawa and Chiemi Hori, in programming discussing the 1980s idol star movement. In 2007, she participated in the ōendan for the inauguration of the Kama Burning Heroes, a baseball club started by Rakyō Ide, an owarai performer and member of the talent group Takeshi Gundan.

Discography

Singles

Albums

Studio albums 
 ERI (1986) (1990, re-release)
 E-AREA (1987)
 ritardando (1987)
 Image (1987)

Compilation albums 
  (1987)
  (1989)
 Last Message (1990)
  series
  (2002)
  (2003)
  (2008)
  (2010)
  (2007)

Other songs 
  (duet with Junichi Mogi) (2005)

References

External links
 E-Area (official blog)

Onyanko Club
1968 births
Japanese idols
Japanese actresses
Japanese lyricists
Japanese women pop singers
People from Saitama Prefecture
Living people
Musicians from Saitama Prefecture